is a Japanese mystery anime series adapted from a manga also known as The Kindaichi Case Files. The series follows the crime solving adventures of a high school student, Hajime Kindaichi, the supposed grandson of the famous (fictional) private detective Kosuke Kindaichi. He is often accompanied by his friend Miyuki Nanase, and sometimes police inspector Isamu Kenmochi. The manga was written by Yōzaburō Kanari or Seimaru Amagi (depending on series) and illustrated by Fumiya Satō.

Produced by Toei Animation and directed by Daisuke Nishio, the anime adaptation of the original manga aired on Nippon Television between April 7, 1997, and September 11, 2000, spanning 148 episodes plus one special episode. In addition, two animated films were released on December 14, 1996, and August 21, 1999, respectively. Seven years after the conclusion of the TV anime, two new animated episodes were aired in Japan on November 12, 2007, and November 19, 2007, respectively.

On April 6, 2007, a DVD collector's box of Kindaichi was released by Warner Home Video to mark the 10th anniversary of airing of the original TV anime.

Episode List
See also The Kindaichi Case Files Characters.

TV series (1997-2000) 
The series consists of 148 episodes with each case spanning between 1 and 4 episodes. A double-length TV special was aired on October 13, 1997, between episodes 23 and 24.

Opening songs:

 1. Confused Memories by Yuko Tsuburaya (eps 1-23)
 2. Meet Again by Laputa (eps 24–42)
 3. Kimi ga Iru Kara... (Because You...) by Yui Nishiwaki (eps 43–69)
 4. Brave by Grass Arcade (eps 70–83)
 5. Justice: Future Mystery by Miru Takayama with Two-Mix (eps 84–105)
 6. Why? (Funky Version) by Color (eps 106–138)
 7. Never Say Why, Never Say No by 566 (feat. Sayuri Nakano) (eps 139–148)

Ending songs:

 1. Futari (Us) by Rie Tomosaka (eps 1–17)
 2. Boo Bee Magic! by Sarina Suzuki (eps 18–29)
 3. Mysterious Night by R-Orange (eps 30–42)
 4. White Page by Platinum Peppers Family (eps 43–62)
 5. Jeans by Ryoko Hirosue (eps 63–73)
 6. Hateshinaku Aoi Sora wo Mita (I Saw An Endless Blue Sky) by Yui Nishiwaki (eps 74–87)
 7. Believe Myself by New Cinema Tokage (eps 88–98)
 8. Sink by Plastic Tree (eps 99–110)
 9. Congracche (Congrats) by CASCADE (eps 111–128)
 10. Ultrider by PENICILLIN (eps 129–147)
 11. Kimi ga Iru Kara... (Because You...) by Yui Nishiwaki (ep 148)

Films (1996-1999)

TV specials (2007)
Two TV specials were produced and aired on Yomiuri TV on November 12 and November 19, 2007.

Original video animations (2012-2013)
Two special OVA episodes were released with the 20th Anniversary of the manga: The first in December 2012 and the second in March 2013.

Kindaichi Case Files R (2014-2016)

The Kindaichi Case Files R, also known as Kindaichi Case Files Returns comprises 47 episodes over two seasons.

Season 1

Season 2

Footnotes

References

File Of Young Kindaichi, The
The Kindaichi Case Files